Nicholas Heath was archbishop of York.

Nicholas Heath is also the name of:

 Nicholas Heath (director), opera director
 Nick Heath (producer), TV and film producer
 Nick Heath (baseball), American baseball player